355th may refer to:

Aviation
355th Fighter Squadron, an inactive United States Air Force unit
355th Fighter Wing, a United States Air Force unit assigned to the Air Combat Command's Twelfth Air Force
355th Tactical Airlift Squadron, a U.S. Air Force squadron based at Rickenbacker Air National Guard Base
355th Troop Carrier Squadron, an inactive United States Air Force unit
355th Operations Group, a United States Air Force unit, assigned to the 355th Wing
355th Aviation Company, of the United States Army
No. 355 Squadron RAF, WWII long range bombing squadron of the British Royal Air Force
355th Reconnaissance Aviation Squadron, a Cold War era unit of the Yugoslav Air Force

Ground forces
355th Infantry Regiment (United States), an infantry regiment of the United States Army
355th Division (Imperial Japanese Army), a WWII home defence infantry division
 355th Infantry Regiment (Imperial Japanese Army), part of the 355th Division (Imperial Japanese Army)
355th Rifle Division, a Soviet WWII infantry division

See also

355 (number)
355, the year 355 (CCCLV) of the Julian calendar
355 BC

355 (disambiguation)